Matev is a Bulgarian masculine surname, its feminine counterpart is Mateva. Notable people with the surname include:

Pavel Matev (1924–2006), Bulgarian poet
Tsvetomir Matev (born 1986), Bulgarian football player

See also
Matevž (given name)

Bulgarian-language surnames